Pierre Eric Omar (Peppie) de Windt (born 13 July 1983, Oranjestad), is an Aruban athlete who ran in the men's 100 meters for Aruba at the 2004 Summer Olympics in Athens, Greece.

References

1983 births
Living people
Olympic athletes of Aruba
Athletes (track and field) at the 2004 Summer Olympics
People from Oranjestad, Aruba
Aruban male sprinters